Chung Hyun-Sook (born 1951 or 1952) is a former table tennis player from South Korea. She won a gold medal in the Women's Team event at the World Table Tennis Championships in 1973. She became vice-president of the Republic of Korea Table Tennis Association in February 2013.

References

1950s births
Living people
Asian Games medalists in table tennis
South Korean female table tennis players
Table tennis players at the 1974 Asian Games
Medalists at the 1974 Asian Games
Asian Games silver medalists for South Korea
20th-century South Korean women